Kabal may refer to:

 Kabal (earthworks), a desert fortification found in northern Kuwait used to house American military and coalition forces
 Kabal, Tehsil, a town in Pakistan
 Kabal (Mortal Kombat), a character from the Mortal Kombat series
 KABAL, a 1982 tabletop role-playing game
 Kabal, Croatia, a village near Farkaševac
 Kabal language, the name for the Martu Wangka dialect used by the Maduwongga people in Australia

See also
 Cabal (disambiguation)
 Kabala (disambiguation)